Chris Waterson may refer to:

Chris Waterson (footballer, born 1961), Australian rules footballer for Essendon and Brisbane
Chris Waterson (footballer, born 1969), Australian rules footballer for Fitzroy